Michael or Mike Morgan may refer to:

Music
 Michael Morgan (conductor) (1957–2021), American conductor
 Mike Morgan (musician) (born 1959), American Texas blues musician, frontman of Mike Morgan and the Crawl
 Mike Morgan (producer), Australian music producer and engineer
 Mike Morgan (songwriter) (born 1948), American singer-songwriter and music producer

Politics 
 Michael Morgan (American politician), from Vermont
 Mike Morgan (politician) (born 1955), U.S. politician from Oklahoma
 Michael Hamilton Morgan (born 1951), American political scientist

Sports

American football
 Mike Morgan (linebacker, born 1942) (1942–1996), American football linebacker
 Mike Morgan (linebacker, born 1988), American football linebacker
 Mike Morgan (running back) (born 1956), American football running back

Cricket
 Michael Morgan (cricketer, born 1932) (1932–2017), English cricketer and medical doctor
 Michael Morgan (cricketer, born 1936), English cricketer
 Michael Morgan (cricketer, born 1952), Scottish-born former English cricketer

Rugby league
 Michael Morgan (rugby league, born 1991), Australian rugby league player
 Michael Morgan (rugby league, born 1995), Australian-Irish rugby league footballer
 Mick Morgan, English rugby league footballer

Other sports
 Michael Morgan (bobsleigh) (born 1961), Jamaica Olympic bobsledder
 Michael Morgan (rower) (born 1946), Australian rower
 Mike Morgan (baseball) (born 1959), American baseball player
 Mike Morgan (boxer), American boxer
 Mike Morgan (sportscaster), American sportscaster

Others
 Michael Ryan Morgan (1833–1911), soldier
 Michael R. Morgan (born 1955), American judge
 Michael K. Morgan (born 1956), Australian neurosurgeon
 Michael J. Morgan (born 1942), British psychologist
 Mike Morgan (meteorologist) (born 1963), American television meteorologist for KFOR-TV in Oklahoma City, Oklahoma
 Mike Morgan (actor) (1929–1958), British actor